Luni, (Pashto: Loni-لونی),  pronounced "Looni", is a village in the Balochistan province of Pakistan.

This village is inhabited by the Loni tribe of Pashtuns. The luni tribe migrated from Muqor Afghanistan to sibi( which was part of afghanistan ) in 1660s during the reign of mizri (panni pashtoon) chiefs of sibi , at the time they were led by Asad khan Luni. It consists of 6 subtribes namely- Badozai ,Nakezai , Sharkoon , Sakhezai , srawar and Azizkhel(sardarkhel family).The Azizkhel (sardarkhel) family consists of offsprings of Sardar Haji Aziz khan Luni . Luni tribe owns 4 pao of water from nari canal ststem. Luni chiefs were called sardars and also enjoyed the title “khan sahib” given by the British before partition. The population in 2011 was 1875 in 302 households. Lunis are well known for their education and they’re the most educated tribe of sibi division with highest literacy rate .  The tribe and the village is currently led by Sardar Abdulaziz khan luni, a senior retired bureaucrat. Famous personalities of tribr include  : Sardar haji Abdul Rasheed khan Luni
(Retired secretary balochistan),
Sardar haji abdul rehman Luni (veteran politician)
Sardar Muhammad Usman khan Luni,
Late Khan sahib sardar haji ahmed khan luni ( member of local british jirga)

References

Populated places in Sibi District